The 2010 Heluva Good! Sour Cream Dips at The Glen was a NASCAR Sprint Cup Series stock car race that was held on August 8, 2010 at Watkins Glen International in Watkins Glen, New York. Contested over 90 laps, it was the twenty-second race of the 2010 Sprint Cup Series season and the second of two road course competitions on the schedule. The race was won by Juan Pablo Montoya, for the Earnhardt Ganassi Racing team. Kurt Busch finished second, and Marcos Ambrose, who started eleventh, clinched third.

Conditions were sunny at the start of the race. Pole position driver Carl Edwards maintained his lead on the first lap, but Jamie McMurray, who had started in the second position on the grid, took the lead before the fifth lap was over. Afterward, Montoya became the leader and would eventually lead a total of 74 laps, more than any other driver. During the final twenty laps, Montoya maintained the lead after multiple cautions. During the final lap, Kurt Busch was gaining on Montoya, but Montoya maintained his position to win his first race of the season.

There were five cautions and ten lead changes among five different drivers throughout the course of the race. Montoya's win was his first of the season and the second of his career. The result moved him up two spots to nineteenth in the Drivers' Championship, 774 points behind of leader Kevin Harvick and 35 ahead of Martin Truex Jr. Chevrolet maintained its lead in the Manufacturers' Championship, twenty-seven points ahead of Toyota and fifty-six ahead of Ford, with fourteen races remaining in the season.

Race report

Background 

Watkins Glen International is one of two road courses to hold NASCAR races, the other being Infineon Raceway.

Before the race, Kevin Harvick led the Drivers' Championship with 3,080 points, and Jeff Gordon stood in second with 2,891. Denny Hamlin was third in the Drivers' Championship with 2,820 points, Jimmie Johnson was fourth with 2,803, and Jeff Burton was in fifth with 2,757. In the Manufacturers' Championship, Chevrolet was leading with 149 points, 22 points ahead of their rival Toyota. Ford, with 99 points, was 12 points ahead of Dodge in the battle for third.

Practice and qualifying 
Two practice sessions were held before the Sunday race—both on Friday. The first session lasted 110 minutes, and the Friday afternoon session ran for 80 minutes. During the first practice session, Greg Biffle was the quickest with a time of 1:12.205. Hamlin and Paul Menard followed in the second and third positions, but were ahead of Burton and Kurt Busch in fourth and fifth. In the Friday afternoon practice session, Biffle remained the quickest with a fastest lap time of 1:11.092. Juan Pablo Montoya followed in the second position, less than a second faster than Marcos Ambrose and Kurt Busch in third and fourth. Harvick placed fifth with a fastest lap time three-tenths of a second off Biffle's pace. Tony Stewart, who won this race in 2009, only managed sixth.

During qualifying, forty-six cars were entered, but only forty-three were able to race because of NASCAR's qualifying procedure. Carl Edwards clinched his fifth career pole position, with a time of 1:10.882. He was joined on the front row of the grid by Jamie McMurray. Montoya qualified third, A. J. Allmendinger took fourth, and Kurt Busch started fifth, after being scored fourth in the practice sessions. The three drivers that did not qualify were J. J. Yeley, Dave Blaney, and Tony Ave.

Race summary 
The race, the twenty-second out of a total of thirty-six in the season, began at 1 p.m. EDT and was televised live in the United States on ESPN. Dan Fife, of Bentley Creek Weslyan Church, began pre-race ceremonies, by giving the invocation. Next, American Idol runner-up, Bo Bice performed the national anthem, and Heluva Good! senior vice president of operations, Scott Blake gave the command for drivers to start their engines. During the pace laps, Kyle Busch had to go to pit lane because of problems with his race car.

Edwards held the lead going through the first corner with McMurray behind him. Going through the esses McMurray ran Edwards off track, but Edwards remained the leader. Edwards vacated the first position was filled by McMurray after Edwards reported that his car was tight. On lap 5, Biffle moved into the fourth position, as Elliott Sadler made a scheduled pit stop for fuel. One lap later, Montoya passed McMurray for the first position. On lap 9, Allmendinger passed McMurray for the second position. Afterward, Ambrose passed Edwards for fourth.

On the 24, Ambrose emerged in second, and would end up right behind Montoya six laps later. On the same lap, the first full course caution was given because P. J. Jones stalled on the track.

On lap 41, Ambrose emerged in the first position, after passing Montoya. Two laps later, the second caution was given because Bobby Labonte and Joe Nemechek were involved in an accident in the Inner Loop. On the restart, Ambrose led, but going through turn one, Ambrose fell to the fourth position, as Montoya became the leader. Afterward, Ambrose passed Allmendinger for the third position. On lap 49, Martin Truex Jr. had a tire rubbing against the car, which caused him to spin as the race resumed. Ambrose moved into the second position, after passing Kurt Busch. By lap 56, Montoya's lead had dropped under one second ahead of Ambrose. Green flag pit stops began on lap 57, as Clint Bowyer drove to pit lane. Next, Harvick and Hamlin had their pit stops. On lap 60, Montoya and Ambrose made pit stops, as Ryan Newman became the leader. One lap later, Bowyer drove to the garage, as the third caution waved because of debris from his car.

On lap 65, Montoya led to the green flag. Two laps later, Boris Said spun and collided with the guardrail, which prompted the fourth caution to come out. The green flag waved on lap 70 with Montoya the leader, but the fifth caution came out two laps later, as Johnson spun sideways, and collided with the wall. The accident also involved Hamlin, who collided with Johnson. The green flag waved on lap 75 with Montoya leading the field back up to speed. On lap 77, Ambrose emerged in second, after passing Kurt Busch. Montoya, however, maintained the lead all the way to take his second win of his NASCAR career. Kurt Busch followed in second, ahead Ambrose in third, Allmendinger in fourth, and Edwards in fifth. The race had a total of five cautions and ten lead changes among five different drivers.

Post-race 

Montoya appeared in Victory Lane after his victory lap to start celebrating his first win of the season, and his second in his career. His win broke a 113 race losing streak, which started in 2007. Following his win, he added, "The last few weeks have been really frustrating for the whole team because we’ve been so close to victory. (It) seemed to keep slipping away."

Following the race, Kurt Busch stated, "To come up short just to Montoya, to beat Ambrose, racing with those two world-class guys, it was fun. I learned quite a bit." In the subsequent press conference, Montoya said, "Last year, we were so hung up on making the Chase that it was all about numbers, it wasn't about being fast or slow." After his third-place finish, Ambrose stated: "We tried hard all day. Juan drove a heck of a race. He wasn't giving me anything. I just wore out everything trying to pass him. He's really hard to pass. It's going to be a big battle. I'm going to see if I can force him into a mistake. I just want to be clean until the end."

After expressing his win, Montoya said, "I think from Day One we worked so hard to bring the performance of the cars to where they are now. I think that really has helped. It’s been frustrating because you could see the performance get better and better. Even last year in the Chase, (I) finished second, finished third, finished second, finished third. That freaking win would never come, so it was getting frustrating." The race result left Harvick leading the Drivers' Championship with 3,210 points. Jeff Gordon, who finished tenth, was second on 3,025, 130 points ahead of Burton and 133 ahead of Kurt Busch. In the Manufacturers' Championship, Chevrolet maintained their lead with 158 points. Toyota remained second with 131 points. Ford followed with 102 points, nine points ahead of Dodge in fourth. A total of 90,000 people attended the race, while 4.931 million watched it on television.

Results

Qualifying

Race results

Standings after the race 

Note: Only the top twelve positions are included for the Drivers' Championship standings.

References 

Heluva Good! Sour Cream Dips at the Glen
Heluva Good! Sour Cream Dips at the Glen
NASCAR races at Watkins Glen International